Murali Perunelly is a member of Kerala Legislative Assembly from Manalur constituency, representing Communist Party of India (Marxist). He was born at Oorakam, Thrissur on 19 June 1950. His parents were T. Raghavan Nair, a freedom fighter and P. Malathy Amma. He is a Secretariat member of CPI (M) District Committee, Thrissur and Kerala Karshaka Sangam Working Committee. He has a bachelor's degree in science and is an agriculturist. Previously elected to K.L.A. in 2006,  he is married to Smt Mallika and they have a daughter.

He served as a Vice President of Mullassery Grama Panchayat, President of Annakara Service Sangham, Advisory Board member of Viyoor Central Jail, DYFI Thrissur District Committee Member, Vice President of Thrissur Toddy Workers Union and Secretary of CPI (M) Manalur Area Committee.

References

Living people
1950 births
Kerala MLAs 2016–2021
People from Thrissur district
Kerala politicians
Communist Party of India (Marxist) politicians from Kerala
Kerala MLAs 2006–2011